Captain Sweet is a Hong Kong-based racehorse.  He won five races in the 2010–2011 season. He was one of the nominees for 2010–2011 Hong Kong Horse of the Year. Captain Sweet was owned by Wong Chin Leung during his racing career, but has now been returned to Australia for his retirement.  Sharing a paddock with two retired Melbourne Cup runners he is now enjoying a slower pace of life.

Background
Captain Sweet is a bay gelding, bred in Australia by J. M. Cappellin. He was sired by Fastnet Rock an Australian sprinter whose progeny include Foxwedge (William Reid Stakes) and Atlantic Jewel (The Thousand Guineas).

Racing career
Based at Sha Tin Racecourse, Captain Sweet has won seven races and over HK$5M in prize money.

References

 The Hong Kong Jockey Club – Captain Sweet Racing Record
 The Hong Kong Jockey Club

Racehorses bred in Australia
Racehorses trained in Hong Kong
Hong Kong racehorses
Thoroughbred family 7